Hypasclera is a genus of false blister beetles in the family Oedemeridae. There are about 11 described species in Hypasclera.

Species
These 11 species belong to the genus Hypasclera:
 Hypasclera costata (Champion, 1896)
 Hypasclera dorsalis (Melsheimer, 1846)
 Hypasclera floridana (Horn, 1896)
 Hypasclera ignota (Arnett, 1951)
 Hypasclera megateles (Arnett, 1951)
 Hypasclera nesiotes (Arnett, 1951)
 Hypasclera nitidula (Horn, 1896)
 Hypasclera pleuralis (LeConte, 1866)
 Hypasclera pseudosericea (Arnett, 1951)
 Hypasclera simplex (Waterhouse, 1878)
 Hypasclera spinosus (Arnett, 1957)

References

Further reading

 
 

Oedemeridae
Articles created by Qbugbot